The 1966 Brownlow Medal was the 39th year the award was presented to the player adjudged the fairest and best player during the Victorian Football League (VFL) home and away season. Ian Stewart of the St Kilda Football Club won the medal by polling twenty-one votes during the 1966 VFL season.

Leading votegetters

References 

1966 in Australian rules football
1966